Abu ol Vafai (also Romanized as Abū ol Vafā’ī, Abolvafa’ī, Abūl Wafaī, and Abū ol Vafā; also known as Gonbad-e Abū ol Vafā'ī and Gonbad-e Abū ol Vafā) is a village in Gol Gol Rural District, in the Central District of Kuhdasht County, Lorestan Province, Iran. At the 2006 census, its population was 411, in 100 families.

References 

Towns and villages in Kuhdasht County